Sir Lee Ah Yain (Chinese: 李遐養; April 1874 – 17 April 1932) was a barrister and political figure of mixed Chinese and Burmese origin in British Burma who served as Minister of Forests.

Lee was educated at the University of Cambridge and was called to the English bar by Lincoln's Inn.

He received the Kaisar-i-Hind Medal, First Class in 1921 and was knighted in 1929.

References 

 Strenuous Decades: Global Challenges and Transformation of Chinese Societies in Modern Asia
 https://www.ukwhoswho.com/view/10.1093/ww/9780199540891.001.0001/ww-9780199540884-e-219586

Knights Bachelor
1932 deaths
Burmese knights
20th-century Burmese lawyers
Members of Lincoln's Inn
Alumni of the University of Cambridge
People from British Burma
Burmese politicians of Chinese descent
Recipients of the Kaisar-i-Hind Medal